Lionel Gatford, D.D. was an English Anglican priest in the 17th century.

The son of Lionel Gatford, he was educated at Jesus College, Cambridge. He was incorporated at Oxford in 1706. He held livings at St Margaret's, Laceby; St Andrew's, Clewer,  and St Dionis Backchurch in the City of London. He was appointed Archdeacon of St Albans in 1713; and Precentor and Treasurer of St Paul's Cathedral in 1714. He died on 15 September 1715

Notes

1715 deaths
18th-century English Anglican priests
Archdeacons of St Albans
Alumni of Jesus College, Cambridge